Cherie Ann Currie (born November 30, 1959) is an American singer, musician, actress and artist. Currie was the lead vocalist of The Runaways, a rock band from Los Angeles, in the mid-to-late 1970s. After The Runaways, she became a solo artist. Then she teamed up with her identical twin sister, Marie Currie, and released an album with her. Their duet "Since You've Been Gone" reached number 95 on US charts. Their band was called Cherie and Marie Currie. She is also well known for her role in the movie Foxes.

Early life
Currie was born to Don Currie and actress Marie Harmon. She was raised in Encino, California, with three siblings, an identical twin sister, Marie Currie, an elder sister, actress Sondra Currie, and a brother, Don Currie Jr.

Currie and her twin sister were given a role on an episode of My Three Sons at the age of two. They were going to sing "Twinkle, Twinkle, Little Star" with Fred MacMurray but they froze during filming and their part was cut from the show. Before Currie and her twin sister rose to fame, they danced on American Bandstand. They appeared on the show as background dancers.

Career

Runaways
Currie was the teenage lead vocalist for the all-female rock band The Runaways with bandmates Joan Jett, Lita Ford, Sandy West, Jackie Fox and Vicki Blue. She joined the band in 1975, at age 15. Bomp! magazine described her as "the lost daughter of Iggy Pop and Brigitte Bardot".

Solo
After three albums with the Runaways (The Runaways, Queens of Noise and Live in Japan), Currie went on to be a solo artist. She signed a contract with Mercury saying she would record four records, but she left the Runaways after the third album, thus she was obligated to record another album. She recorded it solo and the result was Beauty's Only Skin Deep for Polygram Records. Marie Currie did a duet with Cherie on her solo record "Love at First Sight".

Cherie and Marie Currie
Cherie and Marie went on a US tour in 1977, and when Marie would join Cherie on stage to sing the encores the audience would go wild. Then they went on a Japan tour in 1978. While in Japan, the twins performed on many TV shows. So Cherie ran with the idea of two blonds are better than one, and changed the band name from Cherie Currie to Cherie and Marie Currie. With Marie Currie, she recorded Messin' with the Boys for Capitol Records and Young and Wild for Raven. Messin' with the Boys was released in 1980. Messin' with the Boys received more radio play than Beauty's Only Skin Deep and, the song "Since You Been Gone" off Messin' with the Boys charted number 95 on U.S. charts. Both the single "This Time" and the album Messin' with the Boys made the top 200 on U.S. charts. Cherie and Marie performed on television shows in the 1980s including Sha Na Na, The Mike Douglas Show,The Merv Griffin Show among others. Along with the album recordings with Marie, Cherie and Marie sang, wrote, and produced songs for The Rosebud Beach Hotel and its soundtrack called, The Rosebud Beach Hotel Soundtrack. In the film, they acted and sang together. In 1991, Cherie and Marie Currie performed a tribute concert to Paula Pierce, a member of The Pandoras, at the Coconut Teaser. For the final performance, the remaining Pandoras backed the Curries. Currie performed at the Runaways' reunion in 1994 with other Runaways Fox and West. Her sister Marie joined the three Runaways on stage and performed with the band.

In 1998, Cherie and Marie held a concert at the Golden Apple, in support of their re-released version of Messin' with the Boys. Cherie's ex-bandmate West joined Cherie on stage to perform some of the Runaways songs. The Curries and West signed autographs after the show. Young and Wild was released in 1998. It was Cherie and Marie's first compilation album. It contains tracks from Beauty's Only Skin Deep, Messin with the Boys, Flaming School Girls (the Runaways' compilation album), and one new track co-written by Marie. In 1999 Rocket City Records released Currie's studio album The 80's Collection. The album contains guest work by Marie Currie.

Film
Cherie starred in the film Foxes in 1980 with Jodie Foster. She received strong reviews for her acting debut, and because of this film she received many roles in other films. Along with starring in Foxes (her best-known film), she starred in Parasite, Wavelength, Twilight Zone: The Movie, The Rosebud Beach Hotel (with Marie Currie), Rich Girl, and others, as well as numerous guest spots on television series (Matlock and Murder, She Wrote, among others). In 1984 Currie was cast as Brenda in Savage Streets, but was replaced by Linda Blair. In the same year Currie was cast as the lead singer of the fictional band the Dose in the film This Is Spinal Tap, but her character was cut out of the film. Cherie was considered for a part in the 1985 film Explorers but, according to her autobiography, she was in the throes of drug dependency and couldn't even make it to a meeting.

Later years
Currie was a guest vocalist on Shameless's 2013 album, Beautiful Disaster. Currie released singles with ex-bandmate, Lita Ford and Glenn Danzig the same year. On October 19, 2013, Currie won the Rock Legend Award at the sixth annual Malibu Music Awards. The reward was presented to her by ex-bandmate, Lita Ford. That night Currie and Ford played on stage together for the first time in 37 years. Currie released another studio album, Reverie, in 2015. The album features guest work from ex-bandmate, Lita Ford, Currie's son, Jake Hays, and Currie's ex-manager, Kim Fowley. Cherie toured the UK in November 2015, to support her new album. Her special guest on her UK tour was Last Great Dreamers. While in the UK, Currie recorded a live album entitled "Midnight Music in London" which features a special live appearance by Suzi Quatro. It was released in 2016. In late May and early June 2016 Currie toured Australia and New Zealand. In 2018, Currie and her son were nominated for the Marshall Hawkins Award for Best Original Score for the film Take My Hand.

In 2019, Currie's album Blvds of Splendor was released on April 13.

On August 2, The Motivator, her album with Brie Darling, was released.

In 2020 Cherie Currie released an audio version of her memoir, Neon Angel. Her audio version of her book reached number 1 on Amazon's Best Biographies of Punk Rock Musician. In the same year, Currie contributed her vocals to the song "Flatten the Curve" for the band FTC.

Currie is now a wood-carving artist, using a chainsaw to create her works. She has been doing chainsaw art since 2002 and opened her own gallery in 2005 in Chatsworth, California. As a chainsaw artist, Currie has competed in and won awards at three world Chainsaw Art competitions.

Personal life
Currie struggled with drug addiction for much of her younger life, a major factor in the abrupt ending of her career. She later wrote a memoir, Neon Angel, recounting life in the band and her traumatic experiences with drug addiction, sex abuse, and her broken family.

The Runaways, a 2010 biographical drama film executive-produced by Joan Jett, focuses on the group's beginnings and explores the relationship between Currie and Jett. Dakota Fanning portrays Currie.

Currie married actor Robert Hays on May 12, 1990, and they had one son together, Jake Hays. The marriage ended in a divorce in 1997. Jake Hays learned to play guitar well enough to be included in recent recording sessions, and as a member of Currie's new touring band.

Influence on pop culture
In 1979 an alternative cover photo of Currie's album Beauty's only Skin Deep appears in the background of the feature film Rock 'n' Roll High School. It appears when the Ramones are backstage.

The sisters Dot, Helen, and Darby (played by Chloë Sevigny, Carisa Glucksman, and Darby Dougherty) are characters in the 1997 film Gummo,  written and directed by Harmony Korine, who has mentioned that "Dot and Helen were  a combination of Cherie and Marie Currie, home schooling, and The Shaggs."

In 2006 the teen drama The O.C., in the season 3 episode "The Man of the Year", Marissa makes an entrance to "Cherry Bomb", while dressed in a provocative schoolgirl outfit, to Kaitlyn's boarding school. She pays tribute to Currie because when Currie sang "Cherry Bomb" live she wore a provocative outfit.

Discography

With the Runaways

Studio albums
 1976 – The Runaways
 1977 – Queens of Noise

Live albums
 1977 – Live in Japan

Solo

Studio albums
 1978 – Beauty's Only Skin Deep
 1980 – Messin' with the Boys (with Marie Currie)
 1998 – Young and Wild (with Marie Currie)
 1999 – 80's Collection (with Marie Currie)
 2015 – Reverie
 2019 – The Motivator
 2020 – Blvds of Splendor

Live albums
 2013 – Live in Los Angeles 8/30/13
 2016 – Midnight Music in London

EPs
 2007 – Cherry Bomb

Guest appearances
 1978 – Yesterday & Today – Struck Down
 1981 – 707 – The Second Album
 1984 – various artist – The Rosebud Beach Hotel Soundtrack (with Marie Currie)
 1991 – various artist – Rich Girl Soundtrack
 1990 – Tater Totz – Stereo: Sgt. Shonen's Exploding Plastic Eastman Band Request
 1993 – Atsushi Yokozeki Project – Raid
 1998 – Precious Metal – What You See Is What You Get: The Very Best of Precious Metal
 2001 – Katt Lowe & the Othersyde – Katt Lowe & the Othersyde
 2004 – Texas Terri Bomb! – Your Lips...
 2006 – Rick Derringer – Rock 'n' Roll Hoochie Coo: The Best of Rick Derringer
 2007 – Dee Dee Ramone / Johnny Ramone / Marky Ramone – Ramones Solo Performances
 2008 – The Ramones – The Family Tree
 2003 – The Streetwalkin' Cheetahs – Maximum Overdrive
 2013 – Shameless – Beautiful Disaster
 2013 – Warehouse 13 – Runaway
 2013 – Glenn Danzig – "Some Velvet Morning"
 2018 – Fanny Walked The Earth – "When We Need Her"
 2020 – FTC – "Flatten the Curve"  
 2020 - Cherie Currie and Dave Schulz - "What The World Needs Now Is Love"
 2020 - Ryan Cassidy - "Small Price (featuring Cherie Currie)"
 2021 - Ryan Cassidy - "Second Chance (featuring Cherie Currie)"

Singles

Album charts

Filmography

Bibliography

References

External links

 Cherie Currie's Chainsaw Art site
 
 All Music
 2016 Interview – Australian Rock Show Podcast

Living people
20th-century American actresses
21st-century American actresses
Actresses from Los Angeles
Musicians from Los Angeles
American feminists
American identical twins
Identical twin females
Twin musicians
American punk rock singers
American film actresses
American television actresses
American women sculptors
American woodcarvers
Women punk rock singers
Feminist artists
Feminist musicians
The Runaways members
Sex-positive feminists
20th-century American singers
21st-century American singers
American women heavy metal singers
American women rock singers
Women rock singers
20th-century American sculptors
20th-century American women artists
Chainsaw sculptors
Women woodcarvers
20th-century American women singers
21st-century American women singers
1959 births
Women in punk